Rooseveltown is a hamlet in the town of Massena, New York, United States located in St. Lawrence County. It is near the eastern town line, by the Raquette River.

Rooseveltown was the site of a station on the New York and Ottawa Railway, and was originally known as Nyando (NY and O). It was the former location of the Massena Castings Plant where engine block and cylinder heads were cast for GM engines from 1959 until 2009 when the plant was closed and demolished.

Map Coordinates

References

See also
 Seaway International Bridge, bridge across the St.Lawrence River to Canada, from Rooseveltown through Akwesasne to Cornwall
 Three Nations Crossing, international border cross occupying the bridge's trace

Hamlets in New York (state)
Hamlets in St. Lawrence County, New York